Effective complexity is a measure of complexity defined in a 1996 paper by Murray Gell-Mann and Seth Lloyd that attempts to measure the amount of non-random information in a system. It has been criticised as being dependent on the subjective decisions made as to which parts of the information in the system are to be discounted as random.

See also 
 Kolmogorov complexity
 Excess entropy
 Logical depth
 Renyi information
 Self-dissimilarity
 Forecasting complexity

References

External links 
 http://www.cs.brandeis.edu/~pablo/complex.maker.html

Information theory
Computational complexity theory
Measures of complexity